The Little Quilcene Estuary lies on the Quilcene bay on the coast of Jefferson County, Washington in north-west Washington state on the Olympic Peninsula.

Protected area
Just north of the town of Quilcene, the Little Quilcene River flows into the Quilcene Bay. It is 12.2 miles in length, and the combined estuary complex comprises an estimated 350 acres.

in 2009, a restoration project was completed to restore more natural estuarine function, removing approximately 700 feet of sea-dike from the eastern portion of the estuary and 1,500 feet of dike on the north side of the river. A bridge was also be installed over Donovan Creek which also flows into the estuary complex of the Little Quilcene Estuary. The tidal and wave action, after the restoration, was allowed fuller access to the entire northern portion of the larger Quilcene estuary.

Species
Primary Species Benefiting
 Chum salmon
Secondary Species Benefiting
Bull trout
Chinook salmon
Coho salmon
Coastal cutthroat trout
River lamprey
 Steelhead
 Other Wildlife

See also
Hood Canal
Quilcene, Washington
Big Quilcene Estuary
Big Quilcene River
Donovan Creek Estuary
Little Quilcene River
Olympic Peninsula

References

External links
Jefferson Land Trust

Nature reserves in Washington (state)
Bays of Washington (state)
Estuaries of Washington (state)
Protected areas of Jefferson County, Washington
Bodies of water of Jefferson County, Washington
Bays of Jefferson County, Washington